The Mysterious Witness is a 1923 American silent Western film directed by Seymour Zeliff and starring Robert Gordon, Elinor Fair and Nanine Wright.

Cast
 Robert Gordon as Johnny Brant 
 Elinor Fair as Ruth Garland 
 Nanine Wright as Mrs. John Brant 
 Jack Connolly as Ed Carney 
 Wharton James as Jim Garland

References

Bibliography
 Munden, Kenneth White. The American Film Institute Catalog of Motion Pictures Produced in the United States, Part 1. University of California Press, 1997.

External links
 

1923 films
1923 Western (genre) films
American black-and-white films
Film Booking Offices of America films
Films based on American novels
Silent American Western (genre) films
1920s English-language films
1920s American films